These are the most popular given names in the United States for all years of the 1910s. Data from the Social Security Administration.

1910 

Males
John
William
James
Robert
Joseph
Charles; George (tie)
Edward
Frank
Henry
-----
Females
Mary
Helen
Margaret
Dorothy; Ruth (tie)
Anna
Mildred
Elizabeth
Alice
Ethel
-----

1911 

Males
John
William
James
Joseph
Charles; Robert (tie)
George
Frank
Edward
Walter
-----
Females
Mary
Helen
Dorothy; Margaret (tie)
Ruth
Anna
Mildred
Elizabeth
Marie
Gladys
-----

1912 

Males
John
William
James
Robert
George
Joseph
Charles
Frank
Edward
Thomas; Walter (tie)
Females
Mary
Helen
Dorothy
Ruth
Margaret
Anna
Mildred
Frances
Elizabeth
Marie

1913 

Males
John
William
James
Robert
Joseph
Charles
George
Frank
Edward
Thomas
Females
Mary
Helen
Dorothy
Margaret
Ruth
Mildred
Elizabeth
Anna
Marie
Florence

1914 

Males
John
William
James
Robert
Joseph
George
Charles
Frank
Edward
Walter
Females
Mary
Helen
Dorothy
Margaret
Ruth
Mildred
Anna
Elizabeth
Evelyn
Marie

1915 

Males
John
William
James
Robert
Joseph
Charles
George
Edward
Frank
Thomas
Females
Mary
Helen
Dorothy
Margaret
Ruth
Anna
Mildred
Evelyn
Virginia
Elizabeth

1916 

Males
John
William
James
Robert
Charles
George
Joseph
Edward
Frank
Walter
Females
Mary
Helen
Margaret
Dorothy
Ruth
Mildred
Anna
Frances
Elizabeth
Marie

1917 

Males
John
William
James
Robert
Joseph
George
Charles
Edward
Frank
Thomas; Walter (tie)
Females
Mary
Helen
Dorothy
Margaret
Ruth
Anna
Frances
Elizabeth
Mildred
Marie

1918 

Males
John
William
Robert
James
Joseph
Charles
George
Edward
Frank
Thomas
Females
Mary
Helen
Dorothy
Margaret
Ruth
Frances
Virginia
Anna
Mildred  
Elizabeth

1919 

Males
John
William
James
Robert
Charles
Joseph
George
Edward
Frank
Thomas
Females
Mary
Helen
Dorothy
Margaret
Ruth
Virginia
Elizabeth
Mildred
Frances
Anna

References
http://www.ssa.gov/OACT/babynames/index.html
 Most Popular 1000 Names of the 1910s from the Social Security Administration

1910s
1910s in the United States